The 1901 World Allround Speed Skating Championships took place on 9 and 10 February 1901 at the ice rink Djurgårdsbrunnsviken in Stockholm, Sweden.

Edvard Engelsaas was the defending champion, who was not there to defend his championship.
The Fin Franz Wathén won three distances and became the new World champion.

Allround results 

  * = Fell
 NC = Not classified
 NF = Not finished
 NS = Not started
 DQ = Disqualified
Source: SpeedSkatingStats.com

Rules 
Four distances have to be skated:
 500m
 1500m
 5000m
 10000m

One could only win the World Championships by winning at least three of the four distances, so there would be no World Champion if no skater won at least three distances.

Silver and bronze medals were not awarded.

References 

World Allround Speed Skating Championships, 1901
1901 World Allround
World Allround, 1901
International sports competitions in Stockholm
1901 in Swedish sport
February 1901 sports events
1900s in Stockholm